The year 2022 will be the 19th year in the history of the Konfrontacja Sztuk Walki, a mixed martial arts promotion based in Poland. 2022 will begin with KSW 66. For 2021, besides its own channels KSW announced official distribution partnerships with Viaplay and Fight Network, to broadcast the promotion's Pay-per-view events.

Background
Martin Lewandowski announced that KSW has plans to expands even further into Europe and the organisation will hold 12 show in 2022.

List of events

KSW 66: Ziółkowski vs. Mańkowski

KSW 66: Ziółkowski vs. Mańkowski was a mixed martial arts event held by Konfrontacja Sztuk Walki on January 15, 2022, at Netto Arena in Szczecin, Poland.

Background
The event featured two title fight. First, a KSW Lightweight Championship title bout between reigning champion Marian Ziółkowski and title challenger Borys Mańkowski was scheduled as the event headliner. The co-main event featured a light heavyweight bout for the KSW Light Heavyweight Championship between th reigning champion Tomasz Narkun and the challenger Ibragim Chuzhigaev.

Rafał Moks was expected to fight at the event. However, on December 17, ksw sports director Wojsław Rysiewski announced Moks withdrawal from the bout due an injury.

Wojciech Janusz was originally supposed to compete in a light heavyweight bout against Przemysław Dzwonarek. However, Dzwonarek has to withdraw due to undisclosed reason. Damian Skarżyński steps in on a short notice to face Wojciech Janusz, the duel the duel was a catchweight of 98 kg.

A welterweight bout between Tomasz Romanowski and Krystian Kaszubowski was planned for the event. However, Romanowski was forced to withdraw from the fight due to medical reasons. Robert Maciejowski steps in and will fight Kaszubowski at middleweight.

Bonus awards

The following fighters were awarded bonuses:
 Fight of the Night: Ibragim Chuzhigaev vs. Tomasz Narkun
 Submission of the Night: Donovan Desmae
 Knockout of the Night: Gracjan Szadziński

Results

KSW 67: De Fries vs. Stošić

KSW 67: De Fries vs. Stošić was a mixed martial arts event held by Konfrontacja Sztuk Walki on February 26, 2022, at the Global EXPO in Warsaw, Poland.

Background
A KSW Heavyweight Championship bout between reigning champion Phil De Fries and title challenger Darko Stošić was booked as the main event.

A featherweight bout between Krzysztof Klaczek and Dawid Śmiełowski was planned for the event. However, on February 8, Klaczek has to withdraw from the fight due to illness. Filip Pejić stepped in for Klaczek, the bout will now be contest at 68.5 kg limit.

A light heavyweight bout between Hasan Mezhiev and Ivan Erslan was scheduled for the event. However, on February 24, Mezhiev was removed from the contest due to testing positive for COVID-19. He was replaced by Caio Bitencourt. However, in turn, Bitencourt fell ill during his weight cut and has to withdraw from the fight, the bout was cancelled.

Three fighters who missed weight are: Andrzej Grzebyk, who missed weight by one pound (77.9 kg/172 lb) and was fined 30% of his purse, Filip Pejic, who missed weight by one pound (69 kg/152 lb), and was also fined 30% of his purse, and finally, Idris Amizhaev — who missed weight by a full seven pounds heavy (82.9 kg/183 lb) for a 176 lb catchweight, and was fined 50% of his purse.

Bonus awards

The following fighters were awarded bonuses:
 Fight of the Night: Dawid Śmiełowski vs. Filip Pejić
 Submission of the Night: Adrian Bartosiński
 Knockout of the Night: Adam Soldaev

Results

KSW 68: Parnasse vs. Rutkowski

KSW 68: Parnasse vs. Rutkowski was a mixed martial arts event held by Konfrontacja Sztuk Walki on March 19, 2022, at the Radom Sports Center in Radom, Poland.

Background
A KSW Featherweight Championship bout between champion Salahdine Parnasse and title challenger Daniel Rutkowski was scheduled as the event headliner.

Welterweight Shamil Musaev, was expected to compete at KSW 68. However, on February 28, Musaev was removed from  the card Because of the 2022 Russian invasion of Ukraine.

Bonus awards

The following fighters were awarded bonuses:
 Fight of the Night: Damian Janikowski vs Tomasz Jakubiec 
 Submission of the Night: Salahdine Parnasse
 Knockout of the Night: Damian Janikowski

Results

KSW 69: Przybysz vs. Martins

KSW 69: Przybysz vs. Martins was a mixed martial arts event held by Konfrontacja Sztuk Walki on April 23, 2022, at the ATM studio in Warsaw, Poland.

Background
Sebastian Przybysz was scheduled to make the second defense of his KSW Bantamweight Championship against Zuriko Jojua, but Jojua had to withdraw due to a rib injury. Werlleson Martins makes his debut on short notice against Przybysz, the title fight served as the main event.

A middleweight bout between Paweł Pawlak and Cezary Kęsik was scheduled as the co-main event.

Bonus awards

The following fighters were awarded bonuses:
 Fight of the Night: Sebastian Przybysz vs. Werlleson Martins
 Submission of the Night: Sebastian Przybysz
 Knockout of the Night: Wojciech Kazieczko

Results

KSW 70: Pudzianowski vs. Materla

KSW 70: Pudzianowski vs. Materla was a mixed martial arts event held by Konfrontacja Sztuk Walki on May 28, 2022, at the Atlas Arena in Łódź, Poland.

Background
The main event featured a heavyweight superfight between the former World's Strongest Man Mariusz Pudzianowski and the former KSW Middleweight Champion Michał Materla.

The co-main event featured the return to KSW of Daniel Omielańczuk against the former Chelsea F.C. goalkeeper Ricardo Prasel.

The undefeated prospect Radoslaw Paczuski would welcome the former Glory Middleweight Champion Jason Wilnis to the KSW middleweight division.

Sofiia Bagishvili was expected to face Anita Bekus in a flyweight bout at the event. However, Bagishvili pulled out a week before the event due to a wrist injury and she was replaced by promotional newcomer Roberta Zocco.

Bonus awards

The following fighters were awarded bonuses:
 Submission of the Night:  Francisco Barrio & Ricardo Prasel
 Knockout of the Night: Ivan Erslan & Mariusz Pudzianowski

Results

KSW 71: Ziółkowski vs. Rajewski

KSW 71: Ziółkowski vs. Rajewski was a mixed martial arts event held by Konfrontacja Sztuk Walki on June 18, 2022, at the Arena Toruń in Toruń, Poland.

Background
A KSW Lightweight Championship bout between the champion Marian Ziółkowski and title challenger Sebastian Rajewski was scheduled as the event headliner.

In the co-main event the former K-1, Glory and ONE Championship heavyweight Errol Zimmerman makes his KSW debut against ksw vetrant Marcin Różalski. The special rules fight featured three rounds of five minutes with K-1 rules in MMA gloves.

Bonus awards

The following fighters were awarded bonuses:
 Fight of the Night: Donovan Desmae vs. Artur Sowiński
 Fight of the Night: Daniel Torres vs. Borys Mańkowski

Results

KSW 72: Romanowski vs. Grzebyk

KSW 72: Romanowski vs. Grzebyk was a mixed martial arts event held by Konfrontacja Sztuk Walki on July 23, 2022, at the Kadzielnia Amphitheater in Kielce, Poland.

Background

Three fighters who missed weight are: Tomasz Romanowski, who missed weight by six pounds (80.5 kg/177 lb) and was fined 50% of his purse, Oumar Sy, who missed weight by five pounds (95.6 kg/211 lb), and was also fined 50% of his purse, and finally, Hubert Szymajda  — who missed weight by a one pound  (71.3 kg/157 lb), and was fined 30% of his purse.

Bonus awards

The following fighters were awarded bonuses:
 Fight of the Night: Brian Hooi vs. Michał Pietrzak
 Knockout of the Night: Tomasz  Romanowski and Dawid Śmiełowski

Results

KSW 73: Wrzosek vs. Sarara

73: Wrzosek vs. Sarara was a mixed martial arts event held by Konfrontacja Sztuk Walki on August 20, 2022, at the Arena COS Torwar in Warsaw, Poland.

Background

Bonus awards

The following fighters were awarded bonuses:
 Fight of the Night: Tomasz Sarara vs. Arkadiusz Wrzosek
 Submission of the Night: Carl McNally
 Knockout of the Night: Bogdan Gnidko

Results

KSW 74: De Fries vs. Prasel

KSW 74: De Fries vs. Prasel was a mixed martial arts event held by Konfrontacja Sztuk Walki on September 10, 2022, at the Arena Ostrów in Ostrów Wielkopolski, Poland.

Background
A KSW Heavyweight Championship bout between the champion Phil De Fries and title challenger Ricardo Prasel was scheduled as the main event.

Two fighters who missed weight are: Paweł Polityło, who missed weight by four pounds (63.5 kg/140 lb) and was fined 40% of his purse, and Anita Bekus, who missed weight by two pounds (53.5 kg/118 lb) and was fined 30% of her purse.

Bonus awards

The following fighters were awarded bonuses:
 Submission of the Night: Phil De Fries, Sofiia Bagishvili
 Knockout of the Night: Tomasz Romanowski, Borys Dzikowski, Darko Stošić

Results

KSW 75: Stasiak vs. Ruchała 

KSW 75: Stasiak vs. Ruchała was a mixed martial arts event held by Konfrontacja Sztuk Walki on October 14, 2022 at the Strzelecki Park Amphitheater in Nowy Sącz, Poland.

Background
The event was initially scheduled to be headlined by Ibragim Chuzhigaev and Ivan Erslan for the KSW Light Heavyweight Championship. However, the reigning champion could not get into the country in time due to travel regulations and the bout was postponed, making Ruchała vs. Stasiak the main event.

Bonus awards

The following fighters were awarded bonuses:
 Fight of the Night: Robert Ruchała vs. Damian Stasiak
 Knockout of the Night: Henrique da Silva and Mădălin Pîrvulescu

Results

KSW 76: Parnasse vs. Rajewski 

KSW 76: Parnasse vs. Rajewski was a mixed martial arts event held by Konfrontacja Sztuk Walki on November 12, 2022 at the sports and entertainment hall in Grodzisk Mazowiecki, Poland.

Background
Marian Ziółkowski was scheduled to make the fourth defense of his KSW Lightweight title against the KSW Featherweight champion Salahdine Parnasse, however Ziółkowski had to withdraw due to a knee injury. He was replaced by Sebastian Rajewski and the bout was for the interim KSW Lightweight title.

Bartosz Leśko was set to face Paweł Pawlak in a middleweight bout, however Leśko suffered a hand injury and have to withdraw from the fight. Tom Breese steep in to replaced Leśko against Pawlak.

A Heavyweight bout between Filip Bradaric and Marek Samociuk was scheduled for this event. However, a week before the event Bradaric pulled out of the bout due to injury and was replaced by Kamil Gawryjołek.

Bonus awards

The following fighters were awarded bonuses:
 Fight of the Night: Maciej Kazieczko vs. Francisco Albano Barrio
 Submission of the Night: Henry Fadipe
 Knockout of the Night: Artur Szczepaniak

Results

KSW 77: Khalidov vs. Pudzianowski 

KSW 77: Khalidov vs. Pudzianowski will be a mixed martial arts event held by Konfrontacja Sztuk Walki on December 17, 2022 at the Gliwice Arena in Gliwice, Poland.

Background

Bonus awards

The following fighters were awarded bonuses:
 Fight of the Night: Jakub Wikłacz vs. Sebastian Przybysz, Ibragim Chuzhigaev vs. Ivan Erslan
 Submission of the Night: Michał Domin, Shamad Erzanukaev
 Knockout of the Night: Patryk Kaczmarczyk, Bogdan Gnidko

Results

See also
 List of current KSW fighters
 2022 in UFC
 2022 in Bellator MMA
 2022 in ONE Championship
 2022 in Absolute Championship Akhmat
 2022 in Rizin Fighting Federation
 2022 in AMC Fight Nights 
 2022 in Brave Combat Federation
 2022 in Road FC
 2022 Professional Fighters League season
 2022 in Eagle Fighting Championship
 2022 in Legacy Fighting Alliance

References

External links
KSW

2022 in mixed martial arts
Konfrontacja Sztuk Walki events
Konfrontacja Sztuk Walki events
2022 sport-related lists